The NFL Cup was the association football cup competition of the National Football League in South Africa under Apartheid. It was established in 1959 and disbanded in 1977. The competition and only eligible to teams made up of White South Africans. It was widely known as the Castle Cup due to its sponsorship from Castle Breweries.

Previous winners

References

National Football League (South Africa)
Defunct soccer cup competitions in South Africa
Soccer and apartheid

DE:NFL Cup